Hermes Ramírez (Hermes Julián Ramírez Limonta; born January 7, 1948) is a former sprinter from Cuba. Together with Juan Morales, Pablo Montes, and Enrique Figuerola he won an Olympic silver medal in 4 x 100 metres relay in Mexico City 1968. His other achievements include four 100 m and 200 m titles at the Central American and Caribbean Championships.

Achievements
1975 Pan American Games - bronze medal (100 metres)
1970 Central American and Caribbean Games - bronze medal (200 metres)
1970 Central American and Caribbean Games - silver medal (100 metres)
1969 Central American and Caribbean Championships - gold medal (200 metres)
1969 Central American and Caribbean Championships - gold medal (100 metres)
1968 Summer Olympics - silver medal (4 × 100 m relay)
1967 Central American and Caribbean Championships - gold medal (200 metres)
1967 Central American and Caribbean Championships - gold medal (100 metres)
1967 Pan American Games - bronze medal (100 metres)

References

External links
 1975 Pan American 4 x 100 metres relay final

1948 births
Living people
Cuban male sprinters
Olympic athletes of Cuba
Olympic silver medalists for Cuba
Olympic silver medalists in athletics (track and field)
Medalists at the 1968 Summer Olympics
Athletes (track and field) at the 1968 Summer Olympics
Athletes (track and field) at the 1972 Summer Olympics
Athletes (track and field) at the 1976 Summer Olympics
Pan American Games medalists in athletics (track and field)
Pan American Games silver medalists for Cuba
Pan American Games bronze medalists for Cuba
Athletes (track and field) at the 1967 Pan American Games
Athletes (track and field) at the 1971 Pan American Games
Athletes (track and field) at the 1975 Pan American Games
Central American and Caribbean Games gold medalists for Cuba
Competitors at the 1970 Central American and Caribbean Games
Central American and Caribbean Games medalists in athletics
Medalists at the 1967 Pan American Games
Medalists at the 1971 Pan American Games
Medalists at the 1975 Pan American Games
20th-century Cuban people